Reina Miura (三浦 伶奈, born 22 July 1996) is a Japanese professional mixed martial artist, currently competing in the featherweight division of Rizin and DEEP.

Mixed martial arts career

Early career

Openweight career
Miura made her amateur mixed martial arts debut against Nao DATE at Deep Jewels 10 on November 22, 2015. The fight was ruled a no contest, as Miura had missed weight before the fight.

Miura made her professional debut against Eriko Iwamoto, in a 165 lbs catchweight bout, at Deep Jewels 14 on November 3, 2016. She won the fight by a first-round technical submission. Prior to the fight, Miura left the Keishukai HEARTS and began training at Reversal Gym Tachikawa Alpha. It was from this fight onward that she began to compete under the ringname "King Miura" as well.

Miura made her lightweight debut against Shayna Baszler at Deep Jewels 15 on February 25, 2017. She won the fight by unanimous decision.

Miura made her Rizin and openweight debut against Jazzy Gabert at Rizin FF 5: Sakura on April 16, 2017. She won the fight by a second-round submission, forcing Gabert to tap six seconds before the end of the round.

Miura was scheduled to face the professional wrestler Kristin Handel in a 164 lbs catchweight bout at Deep Jewels 16 on May 20, 2017. Handel came into the fight with a 23 cm height and 15kg weight advantage. Nevertheless, Miura won the fight by a first-round technical knockout.

Miura was scheduled to face Lei'D Tapa, another professional wrestler, at Rizin World Grand Prix 2017 Opening Round - Part 1 on July 30, 2017. She won the fight by unanimous decision. Prior to the fight, Miura left Reversal Gym Tachikawa Alpha and began training at FIGHT CLUB 428.

Miura was scheduled to face Young Ji Kim at Deep 79 Impact on September 16, 2017. She won the fight by a first-round armbar submission.

Miura was scheduled to face Crystal Stokes at Rizin World Grand Prix 2017: Opening Round - Part 2 on October 15, 2017. She won the fight by unanimous decision.

Return to lightweight
Miura returned to lightweight for her next bout, as she was scheduled to face Cindy Dandois at Rizin World Grand Prix 2017: 2nd Round on December 29, 2017.

Miura was scheduled to face Soyoung Park at Deep Jewels 19 on March 10, 2018. She won the fight by a first-round submission.

Drop down to featherweight
Miura dropped down to featherweight for her bout against Eun Ji Choi at Deep Jewels 20 on June 9, 2018. She won the fight by a first-round technical knockout.

Miura was scheduled to face Kaitlin Young at Rizin 12 on August 12, 2018. Young won the fight by unanimous decision.

Miura was scheduled to face Judith Ruis at Deep Jewels 22 on December 1, 2018. She won the fight by unanimous decision.

Miura was scheduled to face Mao Ueda, in a 150 lbs catchweight bout, at Deep Jewels 23 on March 8, 2019. She won by a first-round knockout, stopping Ueda after just 25 seconds.

Miura was scheduled to face Stephanie Egger, in a 138 lbs catchweight bout, at Rizin 17 on July 28, 2019. Egger won the fight by unanimous decision.

Miura was scheduled to Nitchanan Thubtrai, back at featherweight, at Deep Jewels 28 on February 24, 2020. She won the fight by a first-round technical knockout.

Miura was scheduled to face Yoko Higashi at Deep 101 Impact on June 20, 2021. Higashi won the fight by unanimous decision.

Miura was scheduled to face the undefeated Tae Murayama at Deep Jewels 35 on December 11, 2021. She won the fight by a first-round submission.

Miura was booked to face Yoko Higashi for the inaugural DEEP Jewels Featherweight championship at Deep Jewels 38 on May 8, 2022.

Mixed martial arts record

|-
| Loss
| align=center|13–5
| Yoko Higashi
| Decision (unanimous)
| Deep Jewels 37
| 
| align=center| 4
| align=center| 5:00
| Tokyo, Japan
| 
|-
| Win
| align=center|13–4
| Tae Murayama
| Submission (armbar)
| Deep Jewels 35
| 
| align=center| 1
| align=center| 4:55
| Tokyo, Japan
|
|-
| Loss
| align=center|12–4
| Yoko Higashi
| Decision (unanimous)
| Deep 101 Impact
| 
| align=center| 3
| align=center| 5:00
| Tokyo, Japan
|
|-
| Win
| align=center|12–3
| Nitchanan Thubtrai
| TKO (punches)
| Deep Jewels 28
| 
| align=center| 1
| align=center| 3:29
| Tokyo, Japan
|
|-
| Loss
| align=center|11–3
| Stephanie Egger
| Decision (unanimous)
| Rizin 17
| 
| align=center| 3
| align=center| 5:00
| Saitama, Japan
|  139 lbs catchweight bout.
|-
| Win
| align=center|11–2
| Mao Ueda
| KO (punches)
| Deep Jewels 23
| 
| align=center| 1
| align=center| 0:25
| Tokyo, Japan
| 150 lbs catchweight bout.
|-
| Win
| align=center|10–2
| Judith Ruis
| Decision (unanimous)
| Deep Jewels 22
| 
| align=center| 3
| align=center| 5:00
| Tokyo, Japan
|
|-
| Loss
| align=center|9–2
| Kaitlin Young
| Decision (unanimous)
| Rizin 12
| 
| align=center| 3
| align=center| 5:00
| Nagoya, Japan
|
|-
| Win
| align=center|9–1
| Eun Ji Choi
| TKO (punches)
| Deep Jewels 20
| 
| align=center| 1
| align=center| 1:40
| Tokyo, Japan
| Featherweight debut.
|-
| Win
| align=center|8–1
| Soyoung Park
| Submission (V1 arm lock)
| Deep Jewels 19
| 
| align=center| 1
| align=center| 1:30
| Tokyo, Japan
|
|-
| Loss
| align=center|7–1
| Cindy Dandois
| Decision (split)
| Rizin World Grand Prix 2017: 2nd Round
| 
| align=center| 3
| align=center| 5:00
| Saitama, Japan
| Return to lightweight.
|-
|Win
|align=center|7–0
|Crystal Stokes
|Decision (unanimous)
|Rizin World Grand Prix 2017: Opening Round - Part 2
|
|align=center|3
|align=center|5:00
|Fukuoka, Japan
|
|-
|Win
|align=center|6–0
|Young Ji Kim
|Submission (armbar)
|Deep 79 Impact
|
|align=center|1
|align=center|4:48
|Tokyo, Japan
|
|-
|Win
|align=center|5–0
|Lei'D Tapa
|Decision (unanimous)
|Rizin World Grand Prix 2017 Opening Round - Part 1
|
|align=center|3
|align=center|5:00
|Saitama, Japan
|
|-
|Win
|align=center|4–0
|Kristin Handel
|TKO (punches)
|Deep Jewels 16
|
|align=center|1
|align=center|4:24
|Tokyo, Japan
|164 lbs catchweight bout.
|-
|Win
|align=center|3–0
|Jazzy Gabert
|Submission (armbar)
|Rizin FF 5: Sakura
|
|align=center|2
|align=center|4:54
|Yokohama, Japan
|Openweight debut.
|-
|Win
| align=center|2–0
| Shayna Baszler
| Decision (unanimous)
| Deep Jewels 15
| 
| align=center|2
| align=center|5:00
| Tokyo, Japan
| Lightweight debut.
|-
| Win
| align=center|1–0
| Eriko Iwamoto
| Technical Submission (armbar)
| Deep Jewels 14
| 
| align=center|1
| align=center|1:57
| Tokyo, Japan
| 165 lbs catchweight bout.

|-
|NC
|align=center| 0-0 (1)
|Nao Murayama
|NC (Miura Missed Weight)
|Deep Jewels 10
|
|align=center|2
|align=center|3:00
|Tokyo, Japan
|
|-
|}

Kickboxing record

|-  style="background:#fbb;"
| 2021-07-29|| Loss ||align=left| Mina Sakurai || SHOOT BOXING Girls S-cup2021 -Road to Tournament- || Taitō, Japan || Decision (Unanimous) || 3 || 3:00
|-
|-  style="background:#fbb;"
| 2020-09-20 || Loss ||align=left| Marina Kumagai || DEEP 97 Impact || Tokyo, Japan || Decision (Unanimous) || 3 || 3:00
|-
|-  style="background:#cfc;"
| 2020-08-22 || Win ||align=left| Marina Kumagai || DEEP 95 Impact || Tokyo, Japan || Decision (Unanimous) || 3 || 3:00
|-
|-  style="background:#cfc;"
| 2018-07-06 || Win ||align=left| Young Ji Kim || Shoot Boxing Girls S-Cup || Tokyo, Japan || Decision (Unanimous) || 3 || 3:00
|-
| colspan=9 | Legend:

See also
 List of female kickboxers
 List of female mixed martial artists
 List of current Rizin FF fighters

References 

1996 births
Living people
Japanese female mixed martial artists
Mixed martial artists utilizing judo
Mixed martial artists utilizing sambo
Japanese female judoka
Japanese sambo practitioners
People from Tokyo
21st-century Japanese women